Death Note is a manga by Tsugumi Ohba and Takeshi Obata that spawned a media franchise.

Death Note may also refer to:

Death Note franchise 
Death Note (2006 film)
Death Note 2: The Last Name, the 2006 sequel
Death Note: Light Up the New World, the third installment in the Japanese film series (2016)
Death Note (2015 TV series)
Death Note: The Musical
Death Note (2017 film)

Other 
The Death Note, a 2016 Chinese horror film
Suicide note, a message written prior to a suicide attempt, also known as a death note

See also
Death Note original soundtracks
List of Death Note chapters
List of Death Note characters
List of Death Note episodes